Joseph Harold Negri (born June 10, 1926) is an American jazz guitarist and educator. He appeared as himself and as "Handyman Negri" in the Neighborhood of Make-Believe segments on Mister Rogers' Neighborhood. He appeared on the 1959 children's television program Adventure Time and with Johnny Costa on the 1954 TV series 67 Melody Lane hosted by Ken Griffin.

Negri taught jazz guitar for 49 years at the University of Pittsburgh, where jazz guitar was first offered as a discipline in higher education. He taught for 46 years at Duquesne University, as well as at Carnegie Mellon University.

Biography
Joe Negri began performing on radio at age three, playing the ukulele and singing. He joined the local musicians' union and began playing professional engagements. In the 1940s, he toured nationally and was a member of the Shep Fields Orchestra from 1943 until 1944, when he entered the Army for two years.

After returning home, he performed in Pittsburgh with his brother, pianist Bobby Negri. He enrolled at Carnegie Mellon University, concentrated on music composition, and spent the 50's playing locally around the Pittsburgh area and often worked with pianist Johnny Costa on KDKA television.  His trio, with accordionlist Dom Trimarkie and bassist Lou Mauro, were the regular band on the live KDKA variety show "Buzz and Bill," hosted by the team of Buzz Aston and Bill Hinds. Around 1960, WTAE, Pittsburgh's ABC television outlet, hired him as their Music Director. Negri played on various live programs and composed theme music as well.  He spent the next twenty-two years working at WTAE as music director. He met Fred Rogers at WTAE, when Rogers hosted a short-lived children's show. In 1968, Negri began appearing as Handyman Negri in the children's program Mister Rogers' Neighborhood for nearly 40 years until Rogers stopped producing new episodes in 2000.  Though many assume Negri was part of the musical ensemble on the show, in fact he only occasionally joined the show's band on special occasions.  Most of his work on the program involved his Handyman Negri character or portraying himself as owner of "Negri's Music Shop" when Rogers presented musical guests.

Negri taught guitar and later helped Duquesne University establish a jazz guitar program.  Over the years he taught many students including Ralph Patt, the inventor of major-thirds tuning.  Negri and Patt recorded in 1989.

In 2010 he recorded the album Fly Me to the Moon with Michael Feinstein and performed with him during the next year at the Newport Jazz Festival. Negri was the subject of a profile in the September 2010 issue of Vintage Guitar magazine written by Rich Kienzle.

Joe Negri archives
The Joe Negri archives consist of the collection of manuscripts, recordings, memorabilia, and original hand-written scores that document his life, work and influence. The collection was donated by Negri in 1999 to the Center for American Music within the University Library System (ULS) at the University of Pittsburgh. The donation became the 1,000th collection at the ULS to have an electronically accessible finding aid (i.e., a guide that describes the contents of an archival collection and creator). The archives contains correspondence, commissioned commercial musical compositions, scores, recordings and television archival footage. His donation also included his college coursework, compositions written for the River City Brass Band, television scores, commercial jingles, and film work. Companies that commissioned work from Negri included McDonald's, Alcoa, Kaufmann's, and Westinghouse.

Discography

As leader
 Afternoon in Rio (MCG Jazz, 1998)
 Guitars for Christmas (MCG Jazz, 2003)
 Uptown Elegance (MCG Jazz, 2004) with Buddy DeFranco
 Dream Dancing (Noteworthy Jazz, 2010)

As sideman
 Michael Feinstein, Fly Me to the Moon (DuckHole, 2010)

Other works
 A Common Sense Approach to Improvisation for Guitar (Mel Bay, 2002)

References

 

 Further reading 
 Articles 
 Anderson, George. "Where Are the Bucks for 'Bucs' Song?". The Pittsburgh Post-Gazette. September 13, 1990.
 Apone, Carl. "Song Writers Beaten To Bucks". The Pittsburgh Press. October 22, 1971.
 Apone, Carl. "Musical Negris: Tale of 2 Brothers". The Pittsburgh Press. April 17, 1980.
 Blank, Edward L. "Personality Profile ..Negri: Composer, Performer, Teacher, Music Director". The Pittsburgh Press. January 25, 1971.
 Cloud, Barbara. "Joe Negri still finds magic in music". The Pittsburgh Post-Gazette. March 5, 2006.
 Guidry, Nate. "Galleria Budget Cuts Sounding Somber Notes For Jazz For Juniors". The Pittsburgh Post-Gazette. February 1, 2002.
 Heimbuecher, Ruth. "They're Jazzing Up Poetry Again". The Pittsburgh Press. February 4, 1983.
 Kienzle, Rich. "Pittsburgh's Guitar Man: Joe Negri". The Pittsburgh Post-Gazette. September 25, 2011.
 King, Peter B.. "The Buzz: For the Record". The Pittsburgh Post-Gazette. June 18, 1998.
 Kirkland, Kevin. "Joe Negri's jazz guitar is his legacy". The Pittsburgh Post-Gazette. September 25, 2011.
 Leonard, Vince. "Camera, Modern Music Illuminate Pittsburgh". The Pittsburgh Press. December 24, 1964.
 Leonard, Vince. "Porter's 'Kate' to TV: Goulet, Carol in Leads; Either Fate or Planned That Way". The Pittsburgh Press. October 19, 1967.
 Leonard, Vince. "Triple-Threat Man". The Pittsburgh Press. June 1, 1969.
 Miller, Jane. "Jazz Profs String 'em Along". The Pittsburgh Post-Gazette. March 13, 1996.
 Moffitt, Mary Irene. "Joe Negri Credits Success To Gene Kelly". The Pittsburgh Post-Gazette. January 2, 1961.
 O'Keefe, Mark. "Handyman Negri Handy With A Guitar". The Beaver County Times. December 24, 2003.
 Peticca, Carole Elaine. "What I Really Wanted to Be". The Pittsburgh Post-Gazette. December 1, 1988.
 "Negri Joins Morning Show". Washington (PA) Observer-Reporter. March 16, 1979.
 "Joe Negri to Teach at D.U.". The Pittsburgh Press. August 3, 1973.

 Books 
 Barth, Joe (2006). Voices in Jazz Guitar : Great Performers Talk About Their Approach to Playing. Pacific, MO : Mel Bay.
 Chapman, Charles. (2001). "Joe Negri (September 1999)". Interviews with the Jazz Greats... and More!. Pacific, MO: Mel Bay Publications. pp. 48–50. 
 Negri, Joe (2002). A Common Sense Approach to Improvisation for Guitar''. Pacific, MO: Mel Bay.

1926 births
Living people
American jazz guitarists
American male television actors
Musicians from Pittsburgh
Carnegie Mellon University College of Fine Arts alumni
Carnegie Mellon University faculty
Duquesne University faculty
University of Pittsburgh faculty
Mainstream jazz guitarists
American jazz educators
History of Pittsburgh
Guitarists from Pennsylvania
American male guitarists
University of Pittsburgh Library System Archives and Collections
20th-century American guitarists
Jazz musicians from Pennsylvania
American male jazz musicians
United States Army personnel of World War II